Henry Chiverton (1511 – 1574/81), of Bodmin, Lanivet and Trehunsey in Quethiock, Cornwall, was an English politician.

He was a Member (MP) of the Parliament of England for Bodmin in 1545, 1547, October 1553 and April 1554; for Cornwall in March 1553, November 1554 and 1555, for Liskeard in 1559 and for Dunheved in 1563.

References

1511 births
Year of death missing
Members of the Parliament of England for Bodmin
Members of the Parliament of England (pre-1707) for Cornwall
Members of the Parliament of England for Launceston
Members of the Parliament of England (pre-1707) for Liskeard
English MPs 1545–1547
English MPs 1553 (Mary I)
English MPs 1554
English MPs 1559
English MPs 1563–1567